Squalius ulanus is a species of ray-finned fish in the family Cyprinidae. It is endemic to the Lake Urmia in Iran.

References

Squalius
Fish described in 1899
Taxa named by Albert Günther